Kuzma Nikolayevich Derevyanko (November 14 (O.S. 1), 1904 – December 30, 1954) was a Ukrainian  Lieutenant General in the Soviet Army.

Life
Derevyanko was born on November 14, 1904, in the village of Kosenivka, Umansky Uyezd, Kiev Governorate, Russian Empire (now Ukraine). Derevyanko (at the time Chief of Staff of the 35th Army) was the representative of the Soviet Union at the ceremonial signing of the written agreement that established the armistice ending the Pacific War and with it World War II.   The Soviet delegation joined other Allied representatives on the battleship USS Missouri which was anchored in Tokyo Bay.  Together, the waiting Allies silently acknowledged the representatives of the Japanese Emperor and the representative of the Imperial Japanese Army, who were the last to arrive. The proceedings began when General MacArthur stepped before a single microphone. The 23-minute surrender ceremony was broadcast worldwide.  Derevyanko signed the Japanese Instrument of Surrender at precisely 9:17 a.m. in Tokyo Bay on September 2, 1945. He served as Soviet representative at MacArthur's headquarters during the US occupation of Japan.

He died on December 30, 1954, and was buried at Novodevichy Cemetery. In 2007, he was posthumously awarded the title of Hero of Ukraine.

Award
He was awarded:
Hero of Ukraine
Two Orders of Lenin
Two Orders of the Red Banner
Order of Suvorov 1st class
Order of Kutuzov 1st class
Order of Bogdan Khmelnitsky
Order of the Red Star
Medal "For the Victory over Germany in the Great Patriotic War 1941–1945"
Medal "For the Victory over Japan"
Medal "For the Capture of Budapest"
Medal "For the Capture of Vienna"
Jubilee Medal "XX Years of the Workers' and Peasants' Red Army"
Jubilee Medal "30 Years of the Soviet Army and Navy"

Notes

References
Mooney, James L. (1976).  Dictionary of American Naval Fighting Ships. Washington, D.C.: United States Navy.

1904 births
1954 deaths
People from Cherkasy Oblast
People from Umansky Uyezd
Soviet lieutenant generals
GRU officers
Frunze Military Academy alumni
Soviet military personnel of the Winter War
Soviet military personnel of World War II
Ukrainian people of World War II
Recipients of the Order of Lenin
Recipients of the Order of the Red Banner
Recipients of the Order of Kutuzov, 1st class
Recipients of the Order of Bogdan Khmelnitsky (Soviet Union), 1st class
Recipients of the Order of Suvorov, 2nd class
Recipients of the Order of Kutuzov, 2nd class
Recipients of the Order of Gold Star (Ukraine)
Burials at Novodevichy Cemetery